South East Asia's first high-speed rail (HSR) project is expected to connect the country's largest cities of Jakarta and Bandung, the 2nd largest city and capital of West Java, covering a distance approaching . , the prime contractor, PT. Kereta Cepat Indonesia China, has stated that the construction of the Jakarta-Bandung phase has reached 90% completion.

Plans and studies have been in the works for high-speed rail (HSR) in Indonesia for many years. It was seriously contemplated in 2008, with detailed plans set forth in 2015. The new plan to start Jakarta-Bandung HSR construction was announced by the Indonesian government in July 2015, after the Chinese President and other world leaders visited the Bandung Conference.

The cost for the line is expected to be $8 billion USD. The EMU KCIC400AF Fuxing trainset and the KCIC400AF CIT 22 01 trainset arrived in Indonesia mid 2022 and was first tested on 16 November 2022, during the G20 Indonesia event.

The Jakarta-Bandung high-speed rail line is planned to start operating commercially in June 2023.

Indonesia already has  a conventional railway network.

History and development
Both Japan and China have expressed their interest in the high speed rail projects in Indonesia. Previously, both countries had carried out comprehensive studies for a project for the Jakarta–Bandung section. Only the Japanese International Cooperation Agency (JICA), had issued a study for a project extending to Surabaya. The Indonesian HSR bid marked a rivalry between Japan and China in their competition for Asian infrastructure projects.

In late September 2015, Indonesia awarded the rail project to China, much to Japan's disappointment. It was said that China's offer to build the Jakarta–Bandung line without requiring an official loan guarantee nor funding from Indonesia was the tipping point of Jakarta's decision.

In January 2016, the transportation minister released a route permit for a high-speed railway between Jakarta and Bandung (142.3 kilometres) with stations located at Halim (Jakarta end), Karawang, Walini, and Tegalluar (Bandung end) with a Tegalluar depot.  of the track would be at ground level,  would be elevated, and  would be underground. A better departure point at the Jakarta end would be the inner city railway station of Gambir but because construction of the Gambir-Halim leg was seen as adding complications, the line was planned from Halim (Jakarta) to Tegalluar (Bandung) with a cost of $5.135 billion. The concession period is 50 years from 31 May 2019 and cannot be prolonged, except in a force majeure situation. Groundbreaking was done on 21 January 2016. The HSR is a project of 60 percent Indonesian consortium and 40 percent China Railway International. The Jakarta–Bandung high-speed rail was planned to begin its operations in 2019. The Japanese proposal would have seen operations begin only by 2023.  The Bandung-Surabaya sectio, though a priority section due to heavy congestion, has been officially shelved for budget reasons since early 2015.

In October 2016, the Indonesian government announced its intention to build a  medium-high speed railway between Jakarta and Surabaya, and invited Japan to participate in this project.

Japan's proposal

Since 2008, Japan has long nurtured a plan to export their Shinkansen high-speed railway technology to Indonesia. During the Indonesia-Japan Friendship Festival in November 2008, Japan showcased their Shinkansen technology to Indonesian audiences.  The idea of high-speed rail backed by funding through soft loans has been proposed by Japan International Cooperation Agency (JICA) for the Indonesian island of Java, linking up the densely populated corridor from the capital Jakarta to Surabaya. The island, similar in many respects including terrain and urban density to pre-HSR Honshu, suffered greatly from both freight and passenger congestion.

The idea had been around for some years. However, a new proposal to divide the project into stages emerged, with the first stage being built from Jakarta to Bandung. The conventional train time of 3 hours would be reduced to 35 minutes at a price of 78 trillion rupiah.  JICA finished the detailed feasibility study in 2014. This succeeded an initial study in 2012. By 2013 Indonesia had been undergoing a revival in railway expansion and upgrades. High-speed corridors had been proposed but not implemented.

Japan – with its reputation as a world-class train-maker – seemed destined to win the contract. However, in 2014 the Indonesian government changed, as Joko Widodo was sworn in as the new president in October of that year. In January 2015 the Widodo administration halted preparations for the high-speed rail project, citing cost reasons and more pressing infrastructure needs in outlying underdeveloped islands outside of Java.

Japanese domination in high-speed rail project appeared to be unchallenged until April 2015, when China made a counter-offer.

In March 2015, Joko Widodo traveled to Tokyo and Beijing. In Tokyo, from 22 to 25 March, Joko Widodo met then-Japanese Prime Minister Shinzo Abe. Widodo obtained a commitment for Japanese loan support for improving Jakarta's municipal rail network, but no progress was made on resolving issues with the Jakarta–Bandung high-speed rail project.

China's bid

On 26 March 2015, Joko Widodo visited Beijing and met China's leader Xi Jinping. Xi publicly announced support for the Indonesian high-speed project and the two governments signed a memorandum specifying China's interest in the Jakarta–Bandung line. In April 2015, China submitted a bid for the Indonesian high-speed rail project, much to Japan's dismay.

In July 2015, the Indonesian government released its plan to build the high-speed rail connecting Jakarta and Bandung, and arranged a contest between Japanese and Chinese train-makers as potential bidders. China responded by launching the Chinese High-speed Rail Technology Exposition in Senayan City shopping mall in Jakarta in August 2015.

Both China and Japan have engaged in a fierce competition through intense lobbying. It was said that the fundamental reason is geostrategy, rather than economics.

Short cancellation
President Joko Widodo was expected to announce the winning bid of Indonesia's first high-speed rail project in early September 2015. However, on 3 September 2015 the Indonesian government announced that it had cancelled the high-speed rail project, and was now favoring the slower and cheaper rail alternative. It was said that the government turned to semi-high-speed rail.

President Joko Widodo preferred a "business-to-business" (as opposed to "government-to-government") approach. This might signify government unwillingness to partially fund or financially guarantee this costly project.

Bid winner
In mid-September 2015, China said it would fully meet the Indonesian government's demands and offered a new proposal that did not require Indonesia to assume any fiscal burden or debt guarantee in proceeding with the project. Later that month, Indonesia selected China for the $5 billion project. Commentators speculated that Beijing had outmaneuvered Tokyo on the bid as a result of a competitive financing package for Indonesia.

Japan's then-Chief Cabinet Secretary Yoshihide Suga called the Indonesian move "difficult to understand" and "extremely regrettable". The situation "can only be described as extremely deplorable," Suga also said. Indonesia's State-Owned Enterprises Minister Rini Soemarno confirmed the Chinese bid was picked instead of the Japanese plan because of the relaxed financing requirements of the Chinese bid. China's victory over Japan in this bid seems to owe mainly to Chinese willingness to accept the financial risk of the project and possibly to finesse international ODA norms. Japan was unable or unwilling to do so.

China supplemented its bid by committing to establish a joint venture with Indonesian firms to produce rolling stock for high-speed rail, electric rail, light rail systems, not only for Indonesia, but also for export to other Asian countries; to transfer related technology; and to renovate and rebuild train stations.

Controversies
In April 2016, five Chinese high-speed rail project workers were arrested in Halim Perdanakusuma Airbase. This incident highlighted the refusal of Indonesian Air Force to give up lands belonging to the Halim Perdanakusuma airbase in East Jakarta. It was reported that one of the railway stations would be located on land currently within Halim airbase.

In February 2018, Onan Hiroshi, a Japanese cartoonist, described Indonesian President Joko Widodo as a "High-speed rail beggar" pointing out Indonesia's request for Japan's assistance in completing the project. The cartoon quickly drew protest from Indonesian internet users, and by 25 February, the cartoonist tweeted an apology, removed the drawings and closed the page.

High-Speed Rail Phase I

Stations 
Initial 4 stations

Rolling stock 

The Jakarta-Bandung High-Speed Rail will use 11 trainsets of the derivative of CR400AF called KCIC400AF. There is also one comprehensive inspection train which is also a derivative of CR400AF called KCIC400AF-CIT. All trains are manufactured by CRRC Qingdao Sifang.

Maintenance facility 
 Tegalluar Depot (Cileunyi, Bandung)

Funding and joint venture
The China Railway Group Limited (CREC) will form a joint venture with a consortium of Indonesia's state-owned enterprises (SOEs) led by PT Wijaya Karya Tbk in developing the first High Speed Train (HST) in the country.

On Friday, 16 October 2015, Chinese and Indonesian state-owned companies officially signed the deal to build the first high-speed railway in Indonesia. The project cost was estimated to be US$5.5 billion (80 trillion rupiah). The deal was signed by China Railway International Co. Ltd. Chairman Yang Zhongmin and Dwi Windarto, the president director of a consortium of Indonesian state companies, PT Pilar Sinergi BUMN Indonesia. China Development Bank has given a commitment to fund 75 percent of the project costs with loan terms of 40 years for the loan—with an initial grace period of 10 years—with fixed loan rate. CRCC will hold majority shares in the planned JV company, while WIKA holds 30 percent and small portions for local toll operator PT Jasa Marga Tbk (IDX: JSMR), train operator PT Kereta Api Indonesia and plantation company PT Perkebunan Nusantara VIII.

In late August 2016, it was reported that the China Development Bank had not yet disbursed funds for the loan and that PT Kereta Cepat Indonesia-China, the consortium executing the project, was not sure when funds would become available.

Progress

2016
 January Indonesian president Joko Widodo attended a ground breaking ceremony near Jakarta and announced that the project had commenced.
 May Continual delays in acquiring land were being reported. The president of the Indonesian joint venture firm managing the project, PT KCIC (Kereta Cepat Indonesia China), Hanggoro Budi Wiryawan, expressed frustration at the Dept of Transport requirement that all of the land needed for the project (estimated to be 600 ha) be acquired before final construction permits could be issued. Hanggoro argued that it was more usual for construction permits to be issued when just 10% of the required land for a project had been acquired. He said that the delays in the Dept of Transport were unreasonable. Issues surrounding acquisition of land were complicated by the fact that the main station at the Jakarta end was planned to be on land occupied by the Indonesian Air Force at Halim Perdanakusuma International Airport. It was not clear whether the Air Force was prepared to release the land.
 August  The Minister for State-Owned Enterprises, Rini Soemarno, said that the process of issuing permits for the project was running smoothly after earlier delays.  She said that she believed that construction on the railway could start within a week.
 November 82 percent of land needed has been acquired, but bank funding will only be attainable after 100 percent land is acquired.

2017
 March The project is stalled due to land, finance and security issues. Among others is the Indonesian Air Force reluctance to release 49 hectares of the lands surrounding Halim Perdanakusuma Airbase on the southeastern outskirts of Jakarta for the construction of the station.
 April  PT Kereta Cepat Indonesia-China (KCIC) and High-Speed Railway Contractor Consortium (KSRCC) signed an engineering, procurement, and construction (EPC) contract on the Jakarta – Bandung bullet train on April 4, 2017. Contractors will proceed with construction following the contract signing.

2018
January The Jakarta Post referred to the project as "stagnant" and Maritime Affairs Coordinating Minister Luhut Binsar Pandjaitan announced that a review would be conducted to consider whether a high-speed rail system really was needed between Jakarta and Bandung because "the cities are only 140 kilometers apart."
March  It was reported that government agencies (the National Land Agency and the Agrarian and Spatial Planning Ministry) suspected that there had been maladministration in the acquisition of over 1,800 plots of land for the project.  As a result, approval of permits for the use of land for the project had been delayed.
April State-owned enterprises minister Rini Soemarno, on a visit to Beijing, said that project construction would start in the coming month, May, and that she hoped that perhaps construction could start even sooner.  She also said that she hoped land acquisition could be completed by the end of May.
July  Three lawsuits received legal approval from the courts to proceed with claims seeking compensation for their properties affected by the project.  Meanwhile, the developer of the project PT Kereta Cepat Indonesia-China said that the progress of the project would not be affected by the lawsuits.  The main financier of the project, China Development Bank, had disbursed $170 million in May and was due to disburse another $1.1 bn before the end of July.

2019

March The boring machine arrived and was assembled. Drilling started under the Jakarta-Cikampek Toll Road between KM 3+600 - KM5+800. Progress Reached 13%
May The Walini tunnel become the first breakthrough tunnel in the high speed rail projects. Celebrated by many group of minister including a Minister of State-Owned Enterprises Rini Soemarno and the West Java Governor Ridwan Kamil. According to Rini Soemarno, progress reached 17.5% but estimated to be 59% in late 2019, and land acquisition was almost 100%. Ridwan Kamil hoped to commence the high speed rail operation in 2021.
September The construction progress reached 32.8% and land acquisition progress reached 99.0%.
October Construction progress 38.2%.

2020
In mid-February 2020, construction progress reached 44 percent and land acquisitions reach 99.96 percent. Due to the COVID-19 pandemic, work of the project has been halted temporarily, resulting in the delay of the targeted finish of construction and start of the operation. Three months later, construction progress reached 48.3 percent and the construction works resumed, which follow government's health and safety measures, such as social/physical distancing in response to the pandemic. In September, Director of KCIC Xin Xuezhong stated that construction progress reached 60 percent and land acquisitions reached 100 percent.

2021

April The General Manager of Material Equipment of PT KCIC stated that until March 2021 the construction of the Jakarta-Bandung High Speed Rail has reached 70 percent and is expected to be completed by the end of 2022.
November Construction progress 79%

2022 

 According to the Jakarta Post, Dwiyana Slamet Riyadi, the president director of KCIC, said that based on a 2022 third-party review, demand for the Jakarta-Bandung High-Speed Rail line had fallen to 31,215 passenger trips per day, just over half of the 61,157 estimated in a 2017 feasibility study.
 September KCIC received the first delivery of KCIC400AF trainsets in Tanjung Priok Port, Jakarta.
 November During the G20 Summit in Bali, President Jokowi and Xi remotely attended the trial run of CIT400AF inspection train, which ended a series of its maiden powered runs on HSR tracks to the west of Tegalluar station. 
 December A track laying machine and a DF4B locomotive used in the construction of the railway derailed in West Bandung west of Padalarang station, killing 2 workers and injuring another four. As result, track laying activities were temporarily halted while other construction works were allowed to continue.

See also 
 High-speed rail in Asia

References

External links 
 NHK: China defeats Japan in high speed railway project in Indonesia
 VOA News: Fast and Furious: China, Japan Battle for High-Speed Rail (On Assignment)

Indonesia
Proposed rail infrastructure in Indonesia
Rail transport in Indonesia
Standard gauge railways in Indonesia